The ninety-fifth cabinet of Bulgaria was a caretaker government chaired by prime minister Stefan Yanev. It was appointed by president Rumen Radev after the July 2021 Bulgarian parliamentary election. It succeeded Yanev's first government.

Cabinet

References 
 https://www.trtworld.com/europe/incumbent-pm-yanev-to-lead-bulgaria-to-elections-49988
 http://www.bta.bg/en/c/DF/id/2484861
 https://www.novinite.com/articles/211233/What+Is+in+Focus+of+Bulgaria%27s+New+Interim+Government

2021 in Bulgaria
Politics of Bulgaria
Cabinets established in 2021
2021 establishments in Bulgaria
Cabinets disestablished in 2021